Newtownards was a constituency represented in the Irish House of Commons until 1800.

Members of Parliament

1613–1801
The town was incorporated on 1 April 1613 and a privilege of that incorporation was to send two burgers to serve as members of Parliament. Members of Parliament from 1613 to 1800 inclusive:

Notes

References

Constituencies of the Parliament of Ireland (pre-1801)
Historic constituencies in County Down
Newtownards
1800 disestablishments in Ireland
Constituencies disestablished in 1800
1613 establishments in Ireland